The Blériot-SPAD S.29 was a sport aircraft produced in 1919 by Blériot-SPAD.

Design and development
The Blériot-SPAD S.29 was a two-seat single-bay biplane, with a slightly swept upper wing and a straight lower wing, with the wings connected by a single strut on each side. Ailerons were fitted to the lower wing only. The fuselage was a circular section wooden monocoque structure, with pilot and passenger seated in tandem in a single cockpit. It was powered by a  Le Rhône 9C rotary engine driving a two-bladed propeller fitted with a large hemispherical spinner, mounted on ball-bearings so that it did not rotate with the propeller, possibly a precaution against the spinner disintegrating due to centrifugal force.

Specifications

References

External Links
 Photograph at aviadejavu.ru

1920s French sport aircraft
Blériot aircraft
Single-engined tractor aircraft
Biplanes
Aircraft first flown in 1920
Rotary-engined aircraft